Arghakhanchi is one of the districts of Lumbini Province in Nepal. The district headquarter is Sandhikharka. Its neighboring districts are Palpa in the east, Gulmi in the north, Kapilvastu District in the south and Pyuthan in the west.

History
The district consists of two pre-unification principalities Argha and Khanchi. Argha (Nepali:अर्घा) was the name given to ritual offerings made at the former principality's main Bhagwati Temple. Khanchi may come from the word Khajanchi (Nepali:खजाञ्चि) or tax collector since the center of the latter principality was known for its tax office. Both were two of the Chaubisi rajya (24 principalities) centred in the Gandaki Basin. In 1786 A.D. (1843 BS) during the unification of Nepal the two were annexed by Gorkha. Later the merger was renamed “Arghakhanchi” and added to Gulmi District. Arghakhanchi became a separate district in 1961 A.D. (2018 BS).

Demographics 
In 2001, the population was 208,391. In 1991, the population was 180,884.

At the time of the 2011 Nepal census, Arghakhanchi District had a population of 197,632. Of these, 97.5% spoke Nepali, 1.3% Magar, 0.5% Kumhali, 0.2% Newar, 0.2% Urdu and 0.1% Kham as their first language.

In terms of ethnicity/caste, 32.8% were Hill Brahmin, 18.2% Chhetri, 18.0% Magar, 11.3% Kami, 6.1% Sarki, 3.4% Kumal, 3.2% Damai/Dholi, 2.8% Newar, 0.9% Gharti/Bhujel, 0.9% Musalman, 0.6% Thakuri, 0.5% Sanyasi/Dasnami, 0.4% Gurung, 0.2% Terai Brahmin, 0.1% Badi, 0.1% Gaine, 0.1% Tharu and 0.1% others.

In terms of religion, 97.0% were Hindu, 1.9% Buddhist, 0.9% Muslim and 0.1% Christian.

In terms of literacy, 72.5% could read and write, 2.2% could only read and 25.3% could neither read nor write.

According to the 2011 census the total population was 197,632. Of these 86,266 were male and 111,366 are female. The total number of households was 46,835 and the average household size 4.22 on the basis of usual place of residence. The sex ratio (number of males per 100 females) was 77.5 and population density was 166.

Geography and climate
Arghakhanchi lies between 27'45"N and 28'6"N latitude, and 80'45"E to 83'23"E longitude. It covers 1,193 km. The altitude of the district varies from 305 to 2515 meter above the sea level. 68% of the district is in the mountainous Mahabharat Range and the rest is in the Siwalik Hills. Elevations range from 305 to 2575 m above sea level and about 40% of the total area is forested.

The major rivers of the district are Bangi Khola, Bangsari Khola, Mathurabesi Khola, Banganga Khola, Durga Khola, Sita Khola, Khakabesi Khola, Rangsing Khola, Ratne Khola, Jhimruk Khola, Khankbesi Khola and Thada Khola. Thada lake and Sengleng lake are the major lakes of the district.

Administration
The district consists of six municipalities, out of which three are urban municipalities
Sandhikharka Municipality
Sitganga Municipality
Bhumikasthan Municipality
Chhatradev Rural Municipality
Panini Rural Municipality
Malarani Rural Municipality

Towns and villages
The major town in the district is Sandhikharka which is the headquarter of Arghakhanchi district.

There are many small villages in the district, including Mareng, Bhagawati, Asurkot, Chhatradev Arghakhanchi, Chhatragunj Arghakhanchi Lamchi, Balkot, Bangi, Dharapani, Sandhikharka Dhikura, Dibharna, Khanchikot, Kimadada, Kura, Phudbang, Bangla, Adguri, Khana, Khanadaha, Pali, and Dhatiwang.

Hatari Neta is a government school in Arghakhanchi. They are said to have good facilities in terms of roads, electric power, education, etc. Villages in the west and south part of the district have relatively little development as compared to the villages of the north and east side. Sano Gaun is the most popular place for visit. Lamchi is another popular village in Arghakhanchi.

Deurali temple is in the area and so are Supa Deurali, Argha Mandir and other temples.

References

External links
 
 Arghakhanchi.com news portal

 
Districts of Nepal established in 1962